The Koninklijk Theater Tuschinski (English: Royal Theater Tuschinski) is a movie theatre in Amsterdam, Netherlands, near Rembrandtplein.

History 
The theater was founded by Abraham Tuschinski, together with his brothers-in-law Hermann Gerschtanowitz and Hermann Ehrlich. Tuschinski at the time already operated four theaters in Rotterdam and wanted to open a theater in Amsterdam of worldclass. Construction started on 18 June 1919, the theater was built in Art Deco, Jugendstil and the Amsterdams School style at a cost of circa ƒ 4 million. Tuschinski wanted to open the theatre with the first theatre organ in the Netherlands; unfortunately Wurlitzer couldn't deliver one in time. Determined to open with an organ Tuschinski travelled to Brussels to acquire an existing one from another cinema. On October 28, 1921, the theatre opened its doors for the first time and on the next day Dutch newspaper Het Vaderland wrote: "We declare before us generously that the wildest expectations have been exceeded and that Mr. Tuschinski has donated a theater to our country, of which are unparalleled."

When it first opened, the theater contained electro-technical features, then considered revolutionary. Its unique heating and ventilation system kept the temperature even throughout the building.

During the bombing of Rotterdam on 14 May 1940 Tuschinski lost all four of his cinemas in Rotterdam; his family and his four cinemas outside Rotterdam survived. Following the bombing the Nazis occupied the Netherlands and in May 1940 Tuschinski, Ehrlich and Gerschtanowitz were fired by the Nazis from their own company. Tuschinski was taken over by the German film company Tobis Film. As an act of resistance, on the birthday of Queen Wilhelmina a Dutch and British flag were flown from a window of the theatre. Tobis changed the name Tuschinski to the Tivoli on 1 November 1940. During the occupation in July 1941 a fire broke out whereby murals of Pieter den Besten were lost. Tuschinski and Gerschtanowitz were deported to Auschwitz and Ehrlich to Sobibor; all three were murdered by the Nazis in 1942. After the Dutch liberation the name Tuschinski was restored, but only three members of the Tuschinski, Gerschtanowitz and Ehrlich families survived the war. Max Gerschtanowitz inherited Tuschinski. The site was declared a national monument in 1967 due to its distinctive architecture. In 1983 the Nöggerath Cinema, which was located on the same block, was acquired and renamed Tuschinski 3. The entire complex was sold in 1985 to Cannon and again in 1991 to MGM Cinemas.

The French-based Pathé acquired the MGM Cinemas chain in The Netherlands including Tuschinski in 1995. They renovated the cinema from 1998 to 2002 to its original style and a corridor was constructed to Tuschinski 3, giving the complex a total of 6 auditoriums. Leading up to the cinema's centennial in 2021 Pathé renovated the complex yet again. This time auditorium 2 was brought back to their former glory, including the lost murals of Pieter dan Besten. The former Nöggerath auditoriums were also given an update and in their foyer Bar Abraham opened. During the centennial Time Out magazine named Tuschinski the most beautiful cinema in the world. On 28 October 2021 Femke Halsema, mayor of Amsterdam, announced that King William-Alexander granted the cinema the royal predicate, renaming the complex to Koninklijk Theater Tuschinski (Royal Theater Tuschinski).

Architecture 
The western facade is flanked by two towers. It is decorated with ceramic sculptures and contains several leadlight windows. The facade blends several architectural styles: Art Deco, Art Nouveau, Jugendstil and the Amsterdam School.

The building contains Asian influences while the lobby was designed in a way to offer theatergoers the feeling that they are stepping into an illusion. The Tuschinski's main auditorium has served as both a movie theater and a live performance space since its opening. In addition to a film screen, it also contains a stage and an organ.

Gallery

References

External links 

 Pathé Tuschinski 
 Tuschinski cinema in Amsterdam - history of the theater

Cinemas and movie theaters in the Netherlands
Art Deco architecture in the Netherlands
Art Nouveau architecture in Amsterdam
Art Nouveau theatres
Theatres completed in 1921
Rijksmonuments in Amsterdam
1921 establishments in the Netherlands